Bowa-ye Sofla (also Romanized as Bowā-ye Soflá; also known as Bābā, Bābā Khāneh, Bovā, and Bowā-ye Pā’īn) is a village in Dehdasht-e Gharbi Rural District, in the Central District of Kohgiluyeh County, Kohgiluyeh and Boyer-Ahmad Province, Iran. At the 2006 census, its population was 232, in 44 families.

References 

Populated places in Kohgiluyeh County